S. Ramachandran Pillai (born 7 February 1938) is a communist politician from Kerala, India, Politburo member of the Communist Party of India (Marxist). He was the former General Secretary of All India Kisan Sabha (Peasants Union) and Currently the vice president of the organisation. He has been imprisoned on many occasions, such as during the Emergency 1975–1976.

Education and early life
SRP, as he is popularly known, hails from Alappuzha. He has completed BA from SD College, Alappuzha and BA BL from Law Colleges of Thiruvananthapuram and Ernakulam.

Political career
. He joined the Communist Party in 1956, he was elevated to General Secretary of the Kerala Socialist Youth Federation (the youth wing of CPI(M) in Kerala at that time) from 1968 to 1974. He was the Chief Editor of the Malayalam daily organ of CPI(M), Deshabhimani, from 1987 to 1991. SRP has represented CPI(M) in the Rajya Sabha twice, elected in 1991 and 1997. He is a Politburo member of the Communist Party of India (Marxist) since 1992.

Personal life
He married Rethnamma in 1966 and has three children – Brinda, Bipin Chandran and Bijoy Chandran. His wife died in 2006. His base of operation is Delhi, although he travels extensively across the country as a part of his political work.

References

External links

Communist Party of India (Marxist) politicians from Kerala
1938 births
Living people
Politicians from Alappuzha
Rajya Sabha members from Kerala